Major-General Sir Hubert Jervoise Huddleston,  (20 January 1880 – 2 October 1950) was a senior British Army officer who served as General Officer Commanding (GOC) Northern Ireland District in 1940.

Military career
Educated at Felsted School and Bedford School, Huddleston joined the British Army and was commissioned as a second lieutenant into the Coldstream Guards in 1898. He then served in the Second Boer War. He took part in operations in the Orange Free State from April to May 1900, and the Transvaal in May and June, including actions near Johannesburg and at the Battle of Diamond Hill. During the war he transferred to the Dorsetshire Regiment as a second lieutenant on 26 May 1900, and was promoted to lieutenant on 19 November 1901. He was mentioned in despatches for actions in December 1901 ("for dash and leading … which lead to captures", dated 25 April 1902). He stayed in South Africa throughout the war, which ended in May 1902 with the Treaty of Vereeniging. Four months later, he left Cape Town with other officers and men of the 2nd Battalion, Dorset Regiment on the SS German and arrived at Southampton in late October, when they were posted to Portland.

Huddleston also served in the First World War and became General Officer Commanding (GOC) Sudan in 1924. He was then appointed Commandant of the Sudan Defence Force, the local troops, when they were established a year later. He was appointed commander of the 14th Infantry Brigade in 1930 and then joined Eastern Command in India in 1934. He became commander of the Baluchistan District in Western Command, India, in 1935. He was appointed Lieutenant Governor and Secretary of the Royal Hospital Chelsea and was then briefly GOC Northern Ireland District from April to July 1940 before being appointed Governor General of Anglo-Egyptian Sudan later that year. He retired from that post in the face of considerable local criticism in 1947.

References

Bibliography

External links

Generals of World War II

|-

|-

1880 births
1950 deaths
British Army major generals
Governors-General of Anglo-Egyptian Sudan
Coldstream Guards soldiers
Dorset Regiment officers
Knights Grand Cross of the Order of St Michael and St George
Knights Grand Cross of the Order of the British Empire
Companions of the Order of the Bath
Companions of the Distinguished Service Order
Recipients of the Military Cross
People educated at Bedford School
People from Norfolk
British Army personnel of the Second Boer War
British Army personnel of World War I
British Army generals of World War II
People educated at Felsted School
Sudan Defence Force officers
Military personnel from Norfolk